Astrid Hansen is a Norwegian orienteering competitor and World champion. She won a gold medal in the 1968 World Orienteering Championships with the Norwegian Relay team. She received a bronze medal in 1966.

References

Year of birth missing (living people)
Living people
Norwegian orienteers
Female orienteers
Foot orienteers
World Orienteering Championships medalists
20th-century Norwegian women